William Johnstone (18 May 1901 – 1975) was a Scottish footballer who played as an inside forward or centre forward. His clubs included King's Park and Clyde (two spells) in Scotland, and Reading, Arsenal and Oldham Athletic in England.

While at Clyde, he was selected for the Glasgow FA's annual challenge match against Sheffield in September 1926, scoring twice, and moved to Reading a few weeks later. In his first season with the Royals, he had a prominent role in the club's run to the FA Cup semi-final in 1926–27, and scored the winning goal in a giant-killing victory over reigning English champions Sheffield Wednesday in the same competition two years later.

Signed by Arsenal in summer 1929, technically he was a member of the Gunners' squad that won the Football League title in 1930–31, but he made only two appearances in that campaign before moving on to second-level Oldham mid-season, having failed in his efforts to break into what was a very strong attacking line-up at Highbury.

References

1901 births
1975 births
Date of death missing
Place of death missing
Scottish footballers
Scottish Football League players
Scottish Junior Football Association players
English Football League players
Arsenal F.C. players
Oldham Athletic A.F.C. players
King's Park F.C. players
Clyde F.C. players
Reading F.C. players
Footballers from Fife
People from Markinch
Association football forwards
Rosslyn Juniors F.C. players